The 1918 Penn Quakers football team represented the University of Pennsylvania in the 1918 college football season.

Season summary
The 1918 Penn football team was adversely affected by the Spanish flu sweeping through the city. Head coach Bob Folwell was hospitalized. Only 22 of his players were healthy enough to practice at one point in mid-October. Penn’s scheduled game against Georgia Tech was canceled. Penn postponed a scheduled game with the Navy Yard’s Marines football club. It was rescheduled for October 26 and played at an empty Franklin Field closed to fans to prevent the spread of the virus.

Schedule

References

Penn
Penn Quakers football seasons
Penn Quakers football